Dalea purpurea is a species of flowering plant in the legume family known as purple prairie clover. Native to central North America, purple prairie clover is a relatively common member of the Great Plains and prairie ecosystems. It blooms in the summer with dense spikes of bright purple flowers that attract many species of insects.

Distribution
It is native to central North America, where it occurs from central Canada to the southeastern and southwestern United States, except for the east and west coasts. It is a common and widespread plant within its range, especially on the Great Plains. In 1804, Meriwether Lewis collected a specimen in Nebraska.

Description
The stem is woody with several branches. The leaves are a few centimeters long and are divided into 3 to 7 narrow leaflets. The fruit is a legume pod containing 1 or 2 seeds. The Latin specific epithet purpurea means purple.

Ecology
This plant is adapted to a habitat with periodic wildfires. In some areas, it depends on fire to clear encroaching woody vegetation, as it cannot tolerate shade.

Dalea purpurea is a common member of the flora on the plains of central North America, occurring in a variety of habitat types, including several types of grassland. It occurs in glades, riverbanks and floodplains, oak woodlands, pinyon-juniper woodlands, shrubsteppe, many types of forests, and the Sand Hills of Nebraska. It occurs in a variety of prairie ecosystems. On tallgrass prairie it is associated with plants such as little bluestem (Schizachyrium scoparium), big bluestem (Andropogon gerardi), prairie Junegrass (Koeleria macrantha), prairie dropseed (Sporobolus heterolepis), lead plant (Amorpha canescens), and silky aster (Symphyotrichum sericeum). On midgrass prairie it grows alongside several grasses such as silver bluestem (Bothriochloa saccharoides), purple threeawn (Aristida purpurea), sideoats grama (Bouteloua curtipendula), and sand dropseed (Sporobolus cryptandrus). On shortgrass prairie it is associated with grasses such as blue grama (Bouteloua gracilis), hairy grama (B. hirsuta), and buffalo grass (B. dactyloides). This species may be considered an indicator of pristine prairie.

The nectar and pollen of Dalea purpurea attract many bees, wasps, flies, butterflies, and skippers. Several plasterer bees (genus Colletes) are specialist pollinators of Dalea species, and other insects eat the seeds and leaves.  It is a larval host to the southern dogface (Zerene cesonia).

Uses
This species is used for revegetation efforts on reclaimed land, such as land that has been strip mined. It is good for preventing erosion and for fixing nitrogen in soil. Though it is often found in mid- to late-successional stages of ecological succession, it may also be a pioneer species, taking hold in bare and disturbed habitat, such as roadsides.

Purple prairie clover provides food for a number of animals, such as pronghorn. It also grows in cultivated fields and becomes included in hay for livestock. It is nutritious and is "considered one of the most important legumes in native grasslands on the Great Plains." It also had a number of uses for Native Americans. The leaves are edible and good for making tea and medicines, and the roots are palatable when chewed. The stems were used as brooms by the Pawnee people.

Medicinal plant
Dalea purpurea has been found to contain several active constituents, including pawhuskin A, pawhuskin B, pawhuskin C, and petalostemumol. The pawhuskins possess affinity for the opioid receptors, and pawhuskin A, by far the most potent of the group, acts as a non-selective antagonist of all three opioid receptors, with preference for the κ- and μ-opioid receptors over the δ-opioid receptor.

References

purpurea
Flora of North America
Medicinal plants of North America